The Southern Methodist University football scandal was an incident in which the Mustangs football program at Southern Methodist University (SMU) was investigated and punished for repeated violations of National Collegiate Athletic Association (NCAA) rules and regulations over a period of several years between the late 1970s and mid-1980s. The most serious violation was the maintenance of a slush fund used for "under the table" payments to players and their families to entice them to come to SMU to play.

As an indirect result of SMU's repeated violations, the NCAA instituted a rule change to stiffen penalties for multiple rule violations over a certain period. Most notably the NCAA is now required to consider cancelling a school's season - a step known popularly as the "death penalty" - if a school's violations are severe enough.

Following the 1986 season, the Mustangs were discovered to have once again run afoul of NCAA rules. As a result, the NCAA canceled SMU's 1987 season. SMU was also not permitted to play home games in the 1988 season, but the school decided to cancel the 1988 season as well after finding itself unable to field a viable team.

The severity of the death penalty left the SMU football program in ruin. The Mustangs had only one winning season over the next twenty years and failed to make another bowl game until 2009, and would not return to the national rankings until 2019. To date they are the most severe penalties ever imposed on a Division I football program, and the only time the NCAA has canceled a football-playing school's entire season at any level.

Summary

SMU was the second-smallest school in the SWC (only Rice was smaller) and one of the smallest in Division I-A, with a total enrollment of just over 9,000 students in 1986. From the 1950s onward, the university found it difficult to compete against schools that were double (or more) its size. Prior to the 1980s, SMU had tallied only nine winning seasons since 1949. The effort to keep up with the bigger SWC schools resulted in SMU straying very close to the ethical line and in many cases going over it. While SMU was not the only SWC school to be sanctioned for recruiting violations – in fact at one point, five of the conference's nine member schools were on some form of probation – the university's violations seemed to be the most egregious. According to the 2010 ESPN documentary film Pony Excess, many of these violations took place with the full knowledge of school administrators.

As a result of their attempts to compete with the larger schools in the conference, SMU's football program was under nearly constant scrutiny from the National Collegiate Athletic Association (NCAA) from 1974 onward. SMU was placed on probation five times between 1974 and 1985, and had been slapped with probation seven times overall – more than any other school.

The Scandal

Ron Meyer 
In the late 1970s, attention around SMU football grew. In the 1978 offseason, the university launched a media campaign which caused its average home attendance to double from 26,000 in 1977 to 52,000 in 1978. Even as SMU attendance grew, however, the football team was not immediately successful. Ron Meyer, an up-and-coming coach who had previous success at the University of Nevada, Las Vegas, was hired by SMU in the winter of 1975. In his first four years, Meyer led SMU to a record of just 16–27. Seeing that the Mustangs lacked talent and size, Meyer began to assemble his best recruiting class. His first major recruit was Emmanuel Tolbert, a running back from Little Rock Central High School in Arkansas. Meyer subsequently gained more and more solid recruits under the radar. Former SMU quarterback Lance McIlhenny later referred to Meyer as the greatest salesman he had ever met.

The first payments 
Meyer's recruiting strategy was very aggressive, pursuing the best football players from Texas. Not all of his players were acquired the ethical way, however; under his direction his recruiting staff was paying recruits. According to Steve Endicott, the first payments came at Kashmere High School in Houston: “... It was Ron, Myself, Rob (Robin Buddecke, Endicott’s assistant), and maybe another coach...I can’t pin it down it was maybe twenty or fifty bucks or something like that we gave”. The Kashmere football players would call the SMU recruiters “Santa Claus”. The little payments of US$20 grew into US$500, and escalated to the point that Buddecke was said to have handed out 100-dollar bills to recruits when meeting them at airports.

Players that received Compensation during the scandals time period 
A lot of players received gifts from booster during the period of the scandal. One of the players to receive compensation was Reggie Dupard, who was an NFL first round pick. He admitted to receiving sums of money and a car from a booster during the 80's while he was a receiver for SMU. SMU quarterback Lance McIlheny said that he confronted his coach about other players receiving envelopes of cash and the next day he discovered 700 dollars of cash in his cleats.

1980—1983: success and probation 
Meyer's strategy began to bear fruit in 1980, when the Mustangs qualified for their first bowl game in years with a high powered running offense led by Craig James and Eric Dickerson, the latter of whom had allegedly received a new gold Trans Am as part of his recruitment to SMU. Facing Brigham Young University (BYU) in the 1980 Holiday Bowl, SMU fell 46–45 to BYU despite leading by three touchdowns late in the fourth quarter.

Right after this, SMU was hit with the first of multiple probations by the NCAA. The Mustangs were given a one-year bowl ban as a result of recruiting violations; despite this, the team went on to win the SWC championship and finished ranked fifth in the Associated Press poll. Meyer resigned following the season to take the head coaching position with the New England Patriots of the NFL; his successor, Bobby Collins, picked up right where Meyer had left off and in 1982, the Mustangs finished unbeaten and won the 1983 Cotton Bowl Classic on their way to a #2 finish in the final polls. Collins led SMU to two more bowls in his next two campaigns, a loss in the 1983 Sun Bowl and a win in the 1984 Aloha Bowl; the Mustangs won a share of the SWC championship in the latter year, making it three conference titles in four years for SMU.

Sean Stopperich
The earliest probation came as the result of an investigation into the recruiting practices of several assistant coaches and team boosters. Sean Stopperich, an offensive lineman from Muse, Pennsylvania, who was part of the 1983 recruiting class and who had initially given an oral commitment to the University of Pittsburgh, told investigators that he and his family had received several thousand dollars from SMU boosters and assistant coaches to renege on that commitment and sign with the Mustangs. Stopperich, who dealt with nagging injuries carrying over from his high school playing days into his time in Dallas, would leave SMU in 1985 and return home to Pittsburgh. He initially tried to return to Pitt, but when they would not offer him a scholarship he, instead, enrolled at Temple University, where he pursued an ill-fated comeback. Stopperich suffered injuries in a car accident in 1986 that permanently put an end to his football career.

The NCAA came down significantly harder on SMU than they previously had. The school was not allowed to grant any new football scholarships for the 1985 season, and only fifteen would be available for 1986. The Mustangs received a two-year postseason ban for those two seasons as well as a complete ban from live television for 1986.

The Mustangs' on-field performance almost immediately suffered. Entering 1985 as the third-ranked team by the AP, SMU fell to No. 16 in the poll following a surprising blowout loss to unranked Arizona and then dropped out of the rankings the next week after losing to conference rival Baylor. Losses to Arkansas, Texas A&M, and Oklahoma followed, with the team finishing 6–5 for the year. Then, in 1986, the team regressed. A 5–1 start was followed by a three-game losing streak, and SMU again finished at 6–5 despite breaking into the top 25 of the AP at midseason and getting as high as #18. Their losses included a shutout against Arizona State, giving up 61 points against Notre Dame, and getting shut out in their season finale against Arkansas.

Repeat Violator Rule
In 1985, after SMU was sanctioned, the NCAA called an emergency meeting in New Orleans to deal with a rash of violations that had been uncovered in the late 1970s and early 1980s. At that meeting, the NCAA Council implemented several new rules to combat the problem. Among the decisions made at that meeting was to reinforce the NCAA's power to shut down athletic programs found guilty of egregious violations—a power popularly known as the "death penalty". The new bylaw, called the "Repeat Violator Rule," stated that if a school had been found guilty of two major violations within five years, it could be barred from competing in the sport involved in the second violation for up to two years. The NCAA had only shuttered a season twice in its history--Kentucky men's basketball in 1952–53 and Southwestern Louisiana men's basketball from 1973 to 1975. However, in cases where the death penalty was warranted for a so-called "repeat violator", the NCAA now had to either hand down the penalty or explain why it chose not to do so.

The rule passed with six schools voting against it. SMU was one of them, and their SWC brethren Texas and Houston joined them in dissenting. Like SMU, both schools had recently been under NCAA investigation for improper practices. In 1982 Texas had been cited for recruiting violations and would be so again several months after the Stanley story broke. Houston, meanwhile, found itself accused of paying players as well; this would lead to the forced retirement of their longtime coach Bill Yeoman at the end of the season and later to stiff penalties.

David Stanley
In June 1986, John Sparks, a producer at Dallas–Fort Worth ABC affiliate WFAA-TV, received a tip from a former athletic department employee named Teresa Hawthorne about further wrongdoing at SMU. Sparks' investigation eventually led him to David Stanley, a former Mustangs linebacker from Angleton, Texas.

Stanley, once a highly sought-after recruit from Angleton High School, was part of the same recruiting class as Stopperich and enrolled at SMU in the fall of 1983. At the time, Stanley was also dealing with a substance abuse problem that grew progressively worse over the next two years as he battled injuries and frustration over his inability to crack the starting lineup. Collins eventually cut Stanley from the football team after the 1984 season. Stanley continued to attend SMU for some time afterward but, as he was getting close to obtaining his degree, his substance abuse led the school to rescind the remainder of his scholarship. He tried to appeal the decision but SMU stood firm.

Sparks and WFAA's sports director, Dale Hansen, decided to follow up on the tip and asked Stanley to speak with them regarding this newest set of allegations of impropriety by SMU. Stanley claimed that SMU athletic officials paid him $25,000 to sign with the Mustangs in 1983 and continued to pay him monthly while he played for the team. His mother, Dawn, and his father, Harley, were also allegedly given money. If these claims were proven true, this would have meant that SMU was still paying players after assuring the NCAA that payments had stopped.

Any investigation of SMU carried considerable risk, as the school's alumni had long dominated Dallas' business and social scene. For example, the Dallas Times Herald suffered serious losses in advertising revenue when it broke the Stopperich story. At that time, the Times Herald was already struggling to maintain competition with its rival paper, The Dallas Morning News, and the backlash cost it even more advertising revenue.  Though the paper was eventually vindicated when SMU was placed on probation, the lost revenue never returned, and eventually led to the paper's folding after A.H. Belo Corporation, owner of both the Morning News and WFAA, purchased it in 1991.

Had SMU's alumni chosen to retaliate in the same manner as they had with the Times Herald, Belo risked losing twice as much advertising revenue, if not more, due to the dual ownership of the newspaper and television station. Sparks and Hansen were well aware of this. However, they pressed on, as they had concrete evidence of further wrongdoing. David and Dawn Stanley both were asked to submit to polygraph tests, which they passed.

On October 27, Hansen met with Collins, SMU athletic director Bob Hitch, and administrative assistant Henry Lee Parker. There, Hansen confronted the three men with the accusations laid out by the Stanleys. Hitch, Collins, and Parker denied everything, as Hansen had expected. What they did not know was that Hansen was in possession of a pair of envelopes that had been allegedly sent to Stanley and his family with money inside. One of the envelopes contained particularly damning evidence; the envelope, addressed to "Mrs. Harley Stanley", not only had come directly from the recruiting office, but the initials HLP were printed in black ink on the upper left corner in the same handwriting that the Stanleys' home address was written in. Furthermore, the envelope carried a postmark dated October 4, 1985 — after SMU had been placed on their most recent probation. This incident, therefore, would make them subject to the Repeat Violator Rule if it was indeed proven that they had paid Stanley.

During his initial questioning, Hansen asked Parker if he had ever sent any mail to the Stanley family. After he responded negatively, Hansen produced the envelopes and handed them both to Parker. After pointing specifically to the second one, which bore the initials HLP in the upper left corner, Hansen asked if the envelopes had been sent by him or through the office and Parker responded by saying yes. A moment later, Parker decided to take a second look and put on a pair of reading glasses. This time, he retracted his claim by pointing out the letters were printed by hand onto the envelope and then showed Collins and Hitch, who went along with him; when pressed a second time, Parker said the envelope had not come from him directly saying  "...'cause I don't write that way."

Hansen later said this was the moment where he "had" him. Since all Hansen had to go on was the word of Stanley and his mother, he could not have known for sure if there really had been money in the envelope. In fact, Hansen never actually mentioned money when he produced the envelopes, only asking whether or not there was any correspondence between the AD's office and the Stanley family. By refusing to acknowledge that he had, in fact, sent something to Stanley's family and then backtracking when confronted with evidence that contradicted his statement, Hansen knew Parker was hiding something. Hansen later admitted that Parker could have lied about the contents of the envelopes and his investigation would have been stopped cold. As Hansen said years after the incident, "That was the defining moment. All [Parker] had to say was, 'I'm glad you asked, I sent him an insurance form,' and we would've had to start all over, because every dot that we connected started from the premise that we know he sent something."

After this and the results of the polygraph tests, Hansen came up with one final damning piece of evidence. As part of the investigation, he had Parker submit a sample of his handwriting for analysis. The expert Hansen consulted with confirmed the sample and the writing on the envelope came from the same person and would testify under oath to its authenticity.

On November 12, 1986, Hansen's report was aired as part of a 40-minute post-news special on WFAA. The report also revealed that Stanley had also talked to the NCAA, and that an NCAA investigation was well under way. Two days later, the Morning News revealed that starting tight end Albert Reese was living rent-free in a Dallas apartment. The rent was being paid by George Owen, one of the boosters who had been banned from the athletic program for his role in the events leading up to the 1985 probation. Reese was suspended for the last two games of the season pending an investigation.

Slush fund
On November 19, 1986, 200 professors submitted a petition calling for the end of "quasi-professional athletics" at SMU, including a ban on athletic scholarships. SMU Board of Governors Chairman Bill Clements, who just two weeks earlier had defeated Mark White to regain his seat as Texas' governor, announced that the school would tighten its admissions standards for all athletes. He also said that school officials would drop football entirely if necessary to restore the school's integrity.

Eventually, the NCAA investigation revealed that in 1985 and 1986, thirteen players had been paid a total of $61,000 from a slush fund provided by a booster. Payments ranged from $50 to $725 per month and had started only a month after SMU had been handed its latest probation. The Times Herald later identified the booster as Dallas real-estate developer Sherwood Blount, Jr., who played for the Mustangs from 1969 to 1971 (though according to Parker, other boosters were almost certainly involved). The players had received a total of $47,000 during the 1985–86 school year. Eight of those players were paid an additional $14,000 from September to December 1986. The slush fund was due to be discontinued when the thirteen players had all left SMU. These payments were made with the full knowledge and approval of athletic department staff. According to the Morning News, Hitch knew about the existence of a slush fund as early as 1981 and was involved in the decision to continue the payments even after SMU was placed on probation in 1985. The Morning News also said Collins knew certain players were being paid, but did not know who they were.

Two months after being sworn in as governor, Clements admitted that he had learned about the slush fund in 1984. An investigation by the SMU Board of Governors revealed players had been paid to play since the mid-1970s. According to Clements, the board secretly agreed to phase out the fund at the end of the 1986 season, since the members felt duty-bound to honor previous commitments to players who had already been promised payments. A 1987 investigation by the College of Bishops of the United Methodist Church revealed that Clements had met with Hitch in 1985, and the two agreed that despite the probation, the payments had to continue because the football program had "a payroll to meet."

At least two NFL players were identified as receiving payments—Patriots running back Reggie Dupard and Tampa Bay Buccaneers cornerback Rod Jones. A third player, wide receiver Ron Morris, was drafted by the Chicago Bears. By the end of the 1986 season, according to the Times Herald, only three of the thirteen players still had eligibility remaining.

Soon afterward, SMU president L. Donald Shields resigned; Hitch and Collins followed suit a few days later. According to the United Methodist Church investigation, Hitch, Collins and Parker were each paid $850,000 to maintain their silence on the matter.

The "death penalty"
The nature of the violations led to speculation about the possibility of SMU receiving the death penalty. The revelations came at a time of great concern over the integrity of college sports.

On February 6, 1987, SMU's faculty athletics representative, religious studies professor Lonnie Kliever, delivered a report to the NCAA which recommended an extension of the school's probation an additional four years, until 1990. During this period, SMU would be allowed to hire only six assistant coaches, and only four of them would be allowed to participate in off-campus recruiting. It also recommended that SMU's ban from bowl games and live television be extended until 1989. During those two seasons, SMU proposed dropping two non-conference games from its schedule. SMU's cooperation so impressed the enforcement staff, led by assistant executive director of enforcement and compliance David Berst, that it recommended that the Infractions Committee accept SMU's proposed penalties, with the exception of a ban on non-conference play for two years.

It soon became apparent, however, that the infractions committee was not willing to let SMU off lightly, even though both the enforcement staff and SMU had agreed on the above proposed sanctions. Not only did the members subject Kliever to stern questioning after he and Berst delivered their presentations, but the committee stayed in session longer than usual. On February 20, Berst told Kliever that SMU would indeed get a "death penalty." Ultimately, the committee voted unanimously to cancel SMU's entire 1987 football season and all four of SMU's scheduled home games in 1988.

The committee praised SMU for cooperating with the investigation, saying that Kliever's efforts "went far beyond what could fairly be expected of a single faculty athletics representative."  It also praised SMU's stated intent to operate within the rules when it returned to the field. This cooperation saved SMU from the full death penalty; had this happened, SMU would have had its football program shut down until 1989 and would have also lost its right to vote at NCAA conventions until 1990. However, it said that it felt compelled to impose the death penalty in order to "eliminate a program that was built on a legacy of wrongdoing, deceit and rule violations." SMU's record, the committee said, was "nothing short of abysmal," and the school had made no effort to reform itself over the past decade. The committee also found that SMU had gained a "great competitive advantage" over its opponents as a result of its cheating, and the death penalty was one way of rectifying this advantage.

Berst said years later that in the committee's view, the Mustang football program was so riddled with corruption that it felt "there simply didn't seem to be any options left." Several members of the committee that imposed the sanctions later said that when the NCAA first enacted the "repeat violator" rules, it never anticipated that there would ever be a situation meriting a death penalty. However, they said their investigation of SMU revealed a program completely out of control. The director of enforcement for the NCAA at the time was Dan Beebe.

Penalties
The penalties handed down, in detail:

The 1987 season was canceled; only conditioning drills were permitted during the 1987 calendar year.
All home games in 1988 were canceled. SMU was allowed to play their seven regularly scheduled away games so that other institutions would not be financially affected.
The team's existing probation was extended until 1990. Its existing ban from bowl games and live television was extended to 1989.
SMU lost 55 new scholarship positions over 4 years.
SMU was required to ensure that Owen and eight other boosters previously banned from contact with the program were in fact banned, or else face further punishment.
The team was allowed to hire only five full-time assistant coaches, instead of the typical nine.
No off-campus recruiting was permitted until August 1988, and no paid visits could be made to campus by potential recruits until the start of the 1988–89 school year.

No football in 1988
As a result of the death penalty, a full release was granted to every player on the team, allowing them to transfer to another school without losing any eligibility; most immediately announced they were considering going elsewhere. As soon as the NCAA announced its decision, hundreds of recruiters from 80 universities—including such powerhouses as Oklahoma, Penn State (then the reigning national champions), and Alabama—traveled to SMU in hopes of persuading players to transfer to their schools.

Combined with the year-plus ban on off-campus recruiting, this led to speculation that SMU's football team would stay shuttered in 1988 as well. Indeed, as early as February 27—two days after the sanctions were announced—school officials expressed doubt that SMU would have enough players to field a viable team in 1988. That day, acting athletic director Dudley Parker said that the football team would not return in 1988 "unless we can really have a team" rather than merely "a bunch of youngsters (who) aren't capable of competing."

On April 11, 1987, SMU formally canceled the 1988 season. Acting president William Stallcup said that under the circumstances, SMU could not possibly field a competitive team in 1988. The only way SMU could have returned that year, Stallcup said, was with "walk-ons and only a handful of scholarship athletes and continuing players." Under these circumstances, Stallcup and other officials felt the players would have faced "an undue risk of serious injury."  By this time, more than half of the Mustangs' scholarship players had transferred to other schools.  Also, according to SWC Commissioner Fred Jacoby, there would not have been nearly enough time to find a coach, and the school still did not have a permanent replacement for Hitch.

Aftermath

Effects on those involved

Bill Clements
Bill Clements apologized for his role in continuing the payments in March 1987.  He said that the board had "reluctantly and uncomfortably" decided to continue the payments, feeling it had to honor previous commitments.  However, he said, in hindsight "we should have stopped (the payments) immediately" rather than merely phase the fund out.  He faced calls for his impeachment as a result of admitting his role in the payments; two state legislators argued that he would have never been elected had he honestly addressed his role in the scandal.  While none of these efforts materialized, the scandal effectively ended Clements' political career; he did not run for re-election in 1990.

Bobby Collins
Bobby Collins was not sanctioned by the NCAA for any role in the events leading up to the "death penalty", though the final report criticized him for not providing a convincing explanation for why players were still being paid after the school assured the NCAA that the payments had stopped.  Nonetheless, his reputation was ruined.  While he was a finalist for an opening at Mississippi State in 1990 (which eventually went to Jackie Sherrill), he never coached again at the collegiate level before his death at the age of 88 in 2021.

William Stevens
William Stevens was involved in recruiting four players and was involved in the Naughty Nine scandal, where 9 SMU boosters were banned

Sean Stopperich and David Stanley
Sean Stopperich and David Stanley, the players at the center of the scandal, never recovered from their drug addictions. In 1995, Stopperich was found dead in his Pittsburgh apartment from a cocaine overdose at the age of 29. Stanley, who had entered drug rehab while still attending SMU, never emerged from his substance abuse problems and died in his sleep in 2005, age 41.

Naughty Nine 
The naughty nine were a group of nine boosters, who were banned from the NCAA from giving any financial aid to the university due to committing multiple recruiting violations. One of the Nine boosters was Dallas Developer George Owen, who was outright banned from the NCAA following the scandal. As stated at the time the name of the naughty nine would never be revealed. In 1987, all other eight of the naughty nine had been revealed. The eight other boosters banned were John Appleton, Sherwood Blount, Ken Andrews, Ronnie Horowitz, Jack Ryan and Reid Ryan, William Stevens and George Wilmont.

Short-term effects
SMU returned to football in 1989 under coach Forrest Gregg, a former Hall of Fame lineman with the NFL's Green Bay Packers who had been a star at SMU in the early 1950s. Gregg had also been the head coach for three NFL teams prior to his arrival as coach at SMU, the Cleveland Browns from 1975 to 1977, the Cincinnati Bengals (whom he led to the Super Bowl in his second season), from 1980 to 1983, and the Packers from 1984 to 1987. He was hired in the spring of 1988 and inherited a team made up mostly of freshmen and walk-ons. Gregg's new charges were mostly undersized and underweight; he was taller and heavier than all but a few of the players on the 70-man squad.  The new squad was particularly short on offensive linemen; Gregg had to make several prospective wide receivers bulk up and move to the line.  By nearly all accounts, it would have been unthinkable for SMU to have allowed such a roster to play a competitive schedule in 1988.

Games were moved to Ownby Stadium, a 23,000-seat on-campus facility built in 1926. It had to be heavily renovated to meet Division I-A standards; SMU had not played there regularly since 1947 and had not played any games on campus at all since 1948. The Mustangs played there until 1994, when they moved back to the Cotton Bowl, the scene of SMU's first glory era in the 1940s and 1950s. Since 2000, the Mustangs have played at Gerald J. Ford Stadium, which occupies Ownby Stadium's former physical footprint.

The 1989 Mustangs bore almost no resemblance to their predecessors, which had been consistently ranked and had contended for the national championship as recently as 1982. The new players were younger, smaller, and less experienced than their opponents; one team captain later stated that he questioned whether some of his teammates had played high school football. The team was, as the Associated Press later reported, "scared, almost terrified" to leave the locker room to play number one-ranked Notre Dame on November 11, 1989. The Mustangs lost that game 59–6; defensive coordinator Dale Lindsey later praised Notre Dame coach Lou Holtz, who ordered the Irish to commit multiple intentional delay of game penalties near the goal line to avoid scoring more touchdowns. According to Lindsey, Notre Dame had SMU so badly outmatched that "they could have beat us 156–0."

Worse was the Mustangs' 95–21 defeat by Houston several weeks earlier, the second-worst loss in school history. Eventual Heisman Trophy winner Andre Ware threw six touchdown passes against SMU in the first half, and David Klingler added four more in the second half even with the game long out of reach. Gregg was so disgusted that he refused to shake Houston coach Jack Pardee's hand after the game.  Thirteen players needed knee surgery after the 1989 season, compared to the normal three or four. Gregg, who left coaching to become SMU's athletic director in 1991, said years later, "I never coached a group of kids that had more courage. They thought that they could play with anyone. They were quality people. It was one of the most pleasurable experiences in my football life. Period."

Long-term consequences
Next to the cancellation of two seasons, the most severe sanction in the long term was the loss of 55 scholarships over four years. As a result, the Mustangs did not have a full complement of scholarships until 1992, and it was another year before they fielded a team entirely made up of players unaffected by the scandal. Additionally, in the wake of the scandal, SMU officials opted to significantly increase the admissions standards for prospective athletes, effectively removing them from contention for the kinds of players they attracted in the 1980s.

The SWC suffered greatly as a result of the scandal. It already had a dubious reputation with the number of NCAA violations at its member schools (at one point, only three of its nine members – Arkansas, Baylor, and Rice – were not on probation), and the discovery of the scandal was a blow from which the conference never recovered. Arkansas left the conference after the 1991 athletic season was completed and joined the Southeastern Conference (SEC), leaving nothing but Texas-based schools in the SWC.

Three years later, a series of moves began that resulted in the SWC itself dissolving. In March 1994, the Big Eight Conference announced it was looking to expand its membership and looked to the SWC for candidates. SMU was not one of them, as the Big Eight invited Texas, Texas A&M, Baylor, and Texas Tech to join what would become the Big 12 Conference in 1996. Instead, the Mustangs were offered an invite to the Western Athletic Conference along with Rice and Texas Christian University as part of that conference's own major expansion. The collapse of the SWC likely ruined any chance of SMU quickly recovering from the death penalty. Later, SMU moved with Rice and fellow Texas WAC member UTEP to Conference USA (CUSA), where the school was reunited with its former conference rival Houston, which became a charter member of CUSA after the SWC disbanded.

Today, SMU plays in the American Athletic Conference. The team continues to compete in the Division I Football Bowl Subdivision (FBS) despite having an undergraduate enrollment of about 6,000 students—one of the smallest in FBS.

Prior to joining CUSA, SMU had only one winning season since returning from the death penalty, in 1997. In 2009, the Mustangs made their first bowl appearance since 1984, a 45–10 victory over Nevada in the Hawaii Bowl. They succeeded in winning the CUSA West Division in 2010, giving them their first shot at winning a conference since 1984, but lost in the Conference USA Championship to UCF, 17–7. They did receive a second consecutive bowl bid, however. SMU was invited to participate in that year's Armed Forces Bowl to face Army in what amounted to another home game for SMU: because of construction at the game's primary site, Amon G. Carter Stadium in Fort Worth, the game was held at SMU's Gerald J. Ford Stadium. They would end losing this game despite playing it on home turf by a score of 16–14. In 2011, the Mustangs were invited to the BBVA Compass Bowl in Birmingham, Alabama—the first time they had made three consecutive bowl appearances since the glory years of the early 1980s. The game was played on January 7, 2012, the first January bowl game for SMU since their appearance in the Cotton Bowl in 1983. By coincidence, they played Pittsburgh, the team they had defeated in that Cotton Bowl game, in the BBVA Compass Bowl and defeated them 28–6 for their second bowl win in three seasons. They moved to the American Athletic Conference in 2013. The Mustangs, however, would not return to the national rankings until entering the AP Poll at No. 24 on September 29, 2019.

Over the past 34 seasons, since resuming play in 1989, SMU has played a total of 393 regular season games, with an overall record of 143-247-3 (.367), including a record of 6-54-1 (.100) against top-25 ranked opponents.  The Mustangs possess a record of 3-95-0 (.031) on the road against teams that went on to finish their seasons with a winning record. SMU has played 62 games in which they scored 7 points or fewer, while playing only 16 games in which they surrendered 7 points or fewer.  SMU's record against teams that ended their seasons with a winning record for the year is 24-160-1 (0.130).  The Mustangs have played 27 games against Top 15 opponents, with a record of 1-25-1.

Steve Malin controversy
In November 1999, twelve years after the SMU death penalty, The Dallas Morning News reported on possible academic fraud involving SMU football. Former SMU player Corlin Donaldson alleged that defensive line coach Steve Malin paid another person $100 to take Donaldson's ACT exam in 1998 so that Donaldson would be eligible to attend SMU. Malin, who had been suspended since August, was fired on December 8, 1999. On December 13, 2000, the NCAA placed SMU on two years' probation and vacated ten games from SMU's 1998 season in which Donaldson played, which reduced SMU's record to 1–1 for 1998. SMU's 2005 media guide indicates that the NCAA vacated the first ten games of the 1998 season. The NCAA reported that its infractions committee "concluded that the assistant football coach [Malin] initially suggested that the prospective student-athlete [Donaldson] should participate in academic fraud, actively assisted in the initial fraudulent ACT, had actual knowledge of the fraud in the second ACT and finally, had reason to know that the prospect, after enrolling at the university and becoming a student-athlete, was ineligible to compete by reason of the academic fraud." The NCAA also discovered rules violations regarding recruiting and tryouts dating back to 1995. Additionally, the NCAA extended several self-imposed sanctions that SMU made on coaches' recruiting and official campus visits by high school recruits.

The NCAA and the Death Penalty since the SMU case

The far-reaching effects that resulted from enacting the "death penalty" on SMU has reportedly made the NCAA reluctant to issue another one. Since 1987, 31 schools have committed two major violations within a five-year period, thus making them eligible for the "death penalty."  However, the NCAA has seriously considered shutting down a Division I sport only three times since then—against Kentucky men's basketball in 1989, Penn State football in 2012 and Texas Southern University football and men's basketball in 2012.  It has actually handed down a "death penalty" only twice, both against smaller schools—Division II Morehouse College men's soccer in 2003 and Division III MacMurray College men's tennis in 2005.

In 2002, John Lombardi, then-president of the University of Florida, expressed the sentiment of many college officials when he said:

Despite the NCAA's apparent wariness about imposing such an extreme sanction, it has indicated that the SMU case is its standard for imposing it.  For instance, in its investigation of Baylor basketball, the NCAA deemed Baylor's violations to be as serious as those SMU had engaged in almost 20 years earlier.  However, it praised Baylor for taking swift corrective action, including forcing the resignation of coach Dave Bliss.  According to the committee, Baylor's actions stood in marked contrast to SMU's behavior; as mentioned above, SMU officials knew serious violations were occurring and did nothing to stop them. Bliss was coach at SMU at the same time as the football scandal.  Baylor did receive what amounted to a half-season death penalty – the cancellation of its non-conference games for the 2005–2006 season.

Further supporting this, the NCAA handed down a "death penalty" to Morehouse in 2003 for what it deemed "a complete failure" to comply with NCAA rules and regulations, even though it was Morehouse's first major infractions case.  Additionally, in the Penn State case, the NCAA said that the death penalty was primarily reserved for repeat violators that neither cooperated with the NCAA nor made any effort to implement corrective measures.

In popular culture
The 1991 film Necessary Roughness focused on a university football team in a predicament very similar to the one SMU faced four years earlier. The team was forced to start the season with an almost entirely new team after the previous staff and all but one player were banned due to violations similar to the ones found at SMU.

Pony Exce$$
As noted above, ESPN's 30 for 30 documentary series profiled the SMU football scandal in one of its productions. Pony Exce$$ (purposely spelled with dollar signs) was the thirtieth and last of the original series, airing on December 11, 2010. The documentary was narrated by Patrick Duffy, who had starred in the television series Dallas during this time. The program also included interviews with several former SMU boosters, lead NCAA investigator on the case Dan Beebe and hall of fame coaches Lou Holtz and Grant Teaff who competed against SMU during the 1980s in the Southwest Conference. Other notable interviews included SMU president R. Gerald Turner and broadcaster Brent Musburger.

Many media personalities with connections to Dallas, SMU, or both were interviewed for the film. These included:
Former CBS Sports college football voice Verne Lundquist, who also called Dallas Cowboys games on the radio for many years and grew up in Texas watching Doak Walker play at SMU
Brad Sham, radio voice of the Cowboys and longtime broadcaster of the Cotton Bowl on radio who was the sports director for KRLD-AM at the time of the scandal
WFAA-TV sports director Dale Hansen, whose investigation into the David Stanley matter led to the penalties handed down in 1987 
Dallas Mavericks voice Chuck Cooperstein, who hosted a show on KRLD at the time
Fox Sports’ Skip Bayless, a Texas native who wrote for both Dallas papers during this time covering SMU and who was working for ESPN at the time of the film’s premiere
Richard Justice, senior writer for MLB.com who also covered SMU football for the Times Herald during his brief period there in the early 1980s
Randy Galloway, Dallas radio personality who spent many years as a reporter for the Morning News covering various sports including football
Norm Hitzges, longtime Dallas sports radio host

In addition to the media personalities, head coaches Ron Meyer, Forrest Gregg and June Jones, assistants Steve Endicott and Robin Buddecke, and former players Eric Dickerson, Craig James, David Richards, Bobby Leach, Lance McIlhenny, Harvey Armstrong, and Rod Jones among others were also interviewed for the program. Dawn Stanley and Vinita Lee Piper, David Stanley’s fiancée at the time of his death, also appeared. The film portrayed Stanley as a loose cannon and showed some instances where he committed personal fouls for late hits. Dickerson, in particular, was harshly critical of Stanley, due to an incident at Campisi's Restaurant in 1983; SMU had asked Dickerson, who was starting his rookie season with the Los Angeles Rams, to come and meet with several incoming freshmen. After Stanley made a wisecrack about being bigger than him, Dickerson responded by angrily threatening to beat him up if he did not stop mouthing off, saying, "You're still in high school, you motherfucker. I play in the NFL." Dickerson then supposedly strongly advised the coaches and recruiters not to sign Stanley, calling him "bad news".

It was noted in the review of Pony Exce$$, written by Morning News reporter Barry Horn, that Thaddeus Matula, himself an SMU alum, tried to reach out to both former coach Bobby Collins and booster Sherwood Blount for interviews but both refused to speak to Matula. This did not stop Matula from featuring them in the film.

See also
Death penalty (NCAA)
Penn State child sex abuse scandal 
University of Southern California athletics scandal

References

Further reading
 The Pony Trap. In The Pony Trap book, former SMU football player and member of the Death Penalty team Dave Blewett, backs into the motivation to find out what really happened.

External links
 Former interim SMU president Bill Stallcup describes the impact of and details about the SMU football team's 'death penalty' in this video-based oral history.

1987 Southwest Conference football season
1988 Southwest Conference football season
Academic scandals
Cheating in sports
College football controversies
NCAA sanctions
SMU Mustangs football